Kagisho Evidence Dikgacoi  (born 24 November 1984) is a South African retired professional footballer who is currently the manager of Witbank Spurs. He represented South Africa at international level.

He made his international debut in 2007, and since then has earned 54 caps, scoring twice. He played at the Africa Cup of Nations in 2008 and 2013, and at the 2010 FIFA World Cup.

Club career

Early career
Dikgacoi began his career at local club Cardiff Spurs, before moving to Golden Arrows in 2005 as a little-known holding midfielder from lower league side Bloemfontein Young Tigers. At Arrows, he developed into one of the country's best players in his position and was subsequently rewarded with the captain's armband.

Fulham
On 4 August 2009, Dikgacoi announced that he had reached an agreement with Fulham after a successful trial at the club. The deal was only finalised on 26 August after a work permit was granted. Dikgacoi had trained with his former club Golden Arrows while the work permit process took place in order to maintain fitness. He made his debut on 4 October, but was sent off in the 41st minute for slapping Scott Parker.

Crystal Palace
After appearing only once for Fulham under Mark Hughes in the 2010–11 season, Dikgacoi was allowed to drop down a division and join Crystal Palace in February on a loan deal until the end of the season. He scored his first goal for Crystal Palace against Cardiff on 8 March 2011, before moving permanently to the Eagles on 4 July 2011 for a fee of £600,000.

Cardiff City
On 12 June 2014, Dikgacoi signed a three-year deal with Cardiff City after refusing a new deal with Crystal Palace. He made his debut in a 1–0 loss to Wolverhampton Wanderers, coming on for Aron Gunnarsson on 23 August. His full debut came three days later in the League Cup, where Cardiff beat Port Vale. Following a series of niggling of injuries, Dikgacoi was ruled out for four months with a knee injury in November.

Dikgacoi did not return until the following season, where he started on the opening day against Fulham. He made 25 appearances during the season as Cardiff missed out on the play-offs, before his contract was terminated by mutual consent on 26 August.

Golden Arrows
In October 2016, Dikgacoi returned to former club Lamontville Golden Arrows after training with the team. He signed a short-term deal. As a result of injuries and weight issues, he played in just ten matches and failed to complete a match. The Golden Arrows announced in June 2017 that he would not return for the following season.

Dikgacoi announced his retirement from playing in July 2018.

International career
Dikgacoi made his debut for the South Africa national team on 27 May 2007, in a COSAFA Cup match against Mauritius. He scored his first two goals on 7 June 2008, in a 2010 World Cup qualifier against Equatorial Guinea, which ended 4–1. He was part of Bafana Bafana's 2008 African Nations Cup squad and was also a participant at the 2009 FIFA Confederations Cup, 2010 FIFA World Cup and 2013 African Cup of Nations, held in his home country.

Post-playing career
Following his retirement from playing football Dikgacoi entered the business arena alongside his business partner Tieho Benny Mokhalinyane. In 2018, his apparel company International Sports Apparel Design Institute concluded a deal with the Football Association of Malawi for the supply of kits, tracksuits, and golf shirts.

Career statistics

Club

International goals
Scores and results list South Africa's goal tally first, score column indicates score after each Dikgacoi goal.

References

External links

Kagisho Dikgacoi palace.footballblog Profile
Kagisho Dikgacoi at Footballdatabase

1984 births
Living people
People from Masilonyana Local Municipality
South African soccer players
Association football midfielders
South Africa international soccer players
2008 Africa Cup of Nations players
2009 FIFA Confederations Cup players
Bloemfontein Young Tigers players
Lamontville Golden Arrows F.C. players
South African expatriate soccer players
Expatriate footballers in England
Premier League players
Crystal Palace F.C. players
Fulham F.C. players
English Football League players
Cardiff City F.C. players
South African expatriate sportspeople in England
2010 FIFA World Cup players
2013 Africa Cup of Nations players
Soccer players from the Free State (province)